Dent is a civil parish in the South Lakeland District of Cumbria, England. It contains 203 listed buildings that are recorded in the National Heritage List for England. Of these, one is listed at Grade I, the highest of the three grades, four are at Grade II*, the middle grade, and the others are at Grade II, the lowest grade.  The parish is in the Yorkshire Dales National Park, it contains the villages of Dent, Gawthrop and Cowgill, and is otherwise completely rural.  The large majority of the listed buildings are farmhouses, farm buildings, houses and associated structures.  The Settle–Carlisle line of the former Midland Railway runs through the parish, and structures associated with this are listed, including two viaducts and station buildings.  The other listed buildings in the parish include churches and associated structures, bridges, public houses, shops, a boundary stone, a former water mill, limekilns, a series of milestones, a former school, monuments, a war memorial, and telephone kiosks. 


Key

Buildings

References

Citations

Sources

Lists of listed buildings in Cumbria